Amadeu Teixeira Alves (26 June 1916 – 7 November 2017) or better known as Amadeu Teixeira was a Brazilian football player and  manager who coached the now defunct club  América Amazonas from 1955 until 2008, for 54 consecutive seasons. He holds the world record for the longest-serving manager of all time.    The Amadeu Teixeira Arena in Manaus, opened in 2006 and used for futsal, was named after him.

Honours 
América-AM 
 Campeonato Amazonense: 1994

References

External links
Amadeu Teixeira 

People from Amazonas (Brazilian state)
1926 births
2017 deaths
América Futebol Clube (AM) managers
Brazilian football managers